Camille Grammer Meyer ( Donatacci) is an American actress, dancer, model, and television personality. She is known for appearing on several seasons of the reality television show, The Real Housewives of Beverly Hills. 

Grammer started her career as a dancer, model and actress, and worked as a producer and writer for Grammnet Productions. From 1997 to 2011, she was married to Kelsey Grammer.

Early life
Grammer was born in Newport Beach, California and grew up in Cedar Grove, New Jersey. She studied English literature at Montclair State College in New Jersey, attending New York University and the UCLA School of Theater, Film and Television in Los Angeles.

Career
Grammer started her career as a dancer in the 1980s, working on Club MTV, starring in a dance group performing at the Tavern on the Green in New York City, and appearing in several music videos, including "Give It All You Got" by Rights of The Accused, "The Party Starts Now!" by Manitoba's Wild Kingdom, and "Back to the Grill Again" by MC Serch. In the 1990s, she started working as a model and actress as well, modeling in Playboy publications like Playboy's Book of Lingerie, and appearing in R-rated erotic films such as Marilyn Chambers' Bedtime Stories, New York Nights and The Naked Detective. She also had small roles in mainstream films Private Parts and Deconstructing Harry, in addition to her guest appearance in one episode of Frasier.

She owns half of Grammnet Productions, which has produced a number of television shows from the late 1990s through 2010s, including Girlfriends, Medium and The Game. Within the production company, Grammer has worked as a creator, writer and executive producer.

In 2010, she became one of The Real Housewives of Beverly Hills. While no longer a main cast member of the show, she still often makes semi-regular Housewives appearances. The January 13, 2011 episode of the show, in which she revealed that her husband wanted to leave their marriage, was the No. 1 telecast among adults 18–49 against all cable competition in its timeslot, as well as the highest-rated episode of the season among all viewers. In addition, the Watch What Happens Live episode featuring Camille Donatacci Meyer as guest right after the show outperformed all late night cable talk shows that night.

In 2011, Grammer returned to acting, guest-starring on the season finale of the CBS sitcom $#*! My Dad Says, playing a recently-divorced reality star named Camille. Describing her role, Donatacci said: "My character Camille is basically a parody on myself, obviously, from 'Housewives of Beverly Hills.' Just making fun of it, you know, making fun of all the quirky things I do and say." On whether she is pursuing a full-time acting career, Grammer told: "I studied acting years ago. It was kind of a dream I had years ago, but I gave that up when I got married and had children. I'm not pursuing this. I'd definitely have to go back and take some acting classes if I was! But I have to say, my experience was very enjoyable and of course it would be something I would love to do. It's so much fun to work with such talented people and be involved in the creative process."

Grammer has also made other appearances in various events like co-hosting the Showbiz Tonight special on CNN live from the Academy Awards in Los Angeles and presenting at the 2011 NHL Awards in Las Vegas.

In March 2012, it was announced that Grammer would not return for the third season of The Real Housewives of Beverly Hills for personal reasons. In May 2012, while on the red carpet attending the Race to Erase MS gala, she then stated that she will be returning to the show after all. She did not return to the show as a full time cast member, instead made semi regular guest appearances.

Personal life
Camille met actor Kelsey Grammer in 1996, and they married in Malibu, California in 1997. They have two children, both born via a surrogate mother. In July 2010, she filed for divorce, seeking primary physical custody of the couple's daughter and son, in addition to child support and alimony. The divorce was finalized on February 10, 2011. Camille has accused Kelsey of physical and verbal abuse during their marriage.

After her divorce, she began dating fitness trainer and lawyer Dimitri Charalambopoulos. On October 29, 2013, she filed a domestic violence protective order against Charalambopoulos, saying that he assaulted her two days after her radical hysterectomy for endometrial cancer, when she was staying at Hotel Zaza in Houston, Texas, recovering. The Houston Police Department said that she and Charalambopoulos "broke each other's cell phones" and that her injuries were minor, so no charges have been filed against Charalambopoulos. 

In October 2017, Grammer became engaged to attorney David C. Meyer. They were married on October 20, 2018, in Hawaii.

Her Malibu home was destroyed in the deadly 2018 Woolsey Fire.

Filmography

References

External links

American female dancers
Dancers from California
American film actresses
American socialites
Living people
Female models from California
Actresses from Newport Beach, California
The Real Housewives cast members
Montclair State University alumni
New York University alumni
University of California, Los Angeles alumni
21st-century American women
Year of birth missing (living people)